Haven Memorial Methodist Episcopal Church is a historic Gothic Revival-style church in Waynesboro, Georgia, which was founded by former slaves in 1866.  It is now the Haven-Munnerlyn United Methodist Church.  It was added to the National Register of Historic Places in 1996. It is located on Barron Street south of the junction of Barron Street and 6th Street.

The church burned on September 16, 2017, and was a total loss. Sixty-eight-year-old Palmer Crumbley was found inside the burning church and he was arrested and charged with arson in the incident. 

Construction of the present church building was begun in 1888.

See also
National Register of Historic Places listings in Burke County, Georgia

References

Episcopal church buildings in Georgia (U.S. state)
Properties of religious function on the National Register of Historic Places in Georgia (U.S. state)
Buildings and structures in Burke County, Georgia